Vince Soorley (1923-2010) was an Australian rugby league footballer who played in the 1940s.

Playing career
A Tweed Heads, New South Wales product, Vince Soorley  attracted the attention of St. George officials when he played against the club's touring team in 1946. Soorley also represented the Far North Coast against the English touring team at Grafton on 16 July 1946.

Soorley was a banana farmer and a friend of the St. George lock forward, Walter Mussing.

After spending two seasons at St George, Soorley took up a captain/coach position at the Alpha rugby league club in Central Queensland in 1949. He returned to Sydney in 1950 and played a final season at the Eastern Suburbs club before finishing his career in Warwick and Toowoomba.

Death
Soorley died on 8 March 2010 aged 87.

References

1923 births
2010 deaths
Australian rugby league players
Rugby league players from Tweed Heads, New South Wales
Rugby league second-rows
St. George Dragons players
Sydney Roosters players